The Red Quadrilateral was a term used by the Romanian 1990s media to describe the political alliance that supported the Romanian government between the 1992 and 1996 legislative elections. The 'Quadrilateral', informal at first, consisted of the Democratic National Salvation Front (FDSN, a major party, led by Adrian Năstase, which had supported Ion Iliescu's bid for presidency), the nationalist Romanian National Unity Party (PUNR) of Gheorghe Funar and the Greater Romania Party (at that time national-communist) of Corneliu Vadim Tudor, and the neo-communist Socialist Party of Labour of Ceaușescu era Prime Minister Ilie Verdeț. As Parliament support for the FDSN (renamed Party of the Social Democracy in Romania or PDSR in 1993) government was dwindling, the alliance was made official in January 1995. Only the PDSR and the PUNR were awarded government portfolios, the other two only receiving lower-level positions in the government.

The coalition supported President Ion Iliescu and Prime Minister Nicolae Văcăroiu. (See also Văcăroiu I Cabinet.)

During the last year, Vadim's party officially left the coalition but continued to support it in the Parliament. Funar's and Verdeț' parties did not pass the threshold in 1996, while the other two parties joined the opposition.

Notes 

Defunct political party alliances in Romania
Political history of Romania
Syncretic political movements